Edward Gawler Prior,  (21 May 1853 – 12 December 1920) was a mining engineer and politician in British Columbia.

Early life
Prior was born in Dallowgill, Yorkshire, England, and worked as a mining engineer in England until 1873. He then moved to British Columbia, settling in Nanaimo and took employment as assistant manager of the Vancouver Coal Mining & Land Co., Ltd.  In 1878 he resigned and was appointed Inspector of Mines for the British Columbia government. He left that position and went into business as an iron and hardware merchant in 1880.

Political career
Prior was first elected to the provincial legislature in 1886. In 1888, Prior won a seat in the House of Commons of Canada as a Conservative. From December 1895 to July 1896 and 1897 Prior served as Controller of Inland Revenue in the cabinets of Prime Minister Sir Mackenzie Bowell and his successor Sir Charles Tupper.

He lost his seat in 1901 due to violations of election rules. He moved to provincial politics and was elected to the Legislative Assembly of British Columbia in 1902 becoming minister of mines. In 1902 he became the 15th premier leading the province's last non-partisan administration but was dismissed by the lieutenant governor in 1903 due to charges of conflict of interest that involved giving an important construction contract to his own hardware business, and did not run in the subsequent 1903 general election. He was defeated in 1904 in an attempt to return to the federal House of Commons.

Prior was appointed the 11th lieutenant governor of British Columbia in 1919 but became ill and died in office within a year of his appointment. Edward Gawler Prior is interred in the Ross Bay Cemetery in Victoria, British Columbia.

Prior was the last Canadian premier to be dismissed by a lieutenant-governor, (though William Aberhart, Premier of Alberta, was nearly so in 1937).

References

Sources
University of Victoria, BC History Edward Gawler Prior

External links
 

1853 births
1920 deaths
Canadian Anglicans
Conservative Party of Canada (1867–1942) MPs
English emigrants to Canada
Hardware merchants
Lieutenant Governors of British Columbia
Members of the House of Commons of Canada from British Columbia
Members of the King's Privy Council for Canada
People from the Borough of Harrogate
Premiers of British Columbia